Ed Lee Johnson (June 17, 1944 – April 5, 2016) was an American professional basketball player. After a collegiate career at Tennessee State University, Johnson was selected in both the 1968 ABA draft and 1968 NBA draft.

In a career that spanned 12 seasons, Johnson played in the original American Basketball Association, Continental Basketball Association, and some of the top leagues in Spain and France. He was named the most valuable player of the Eastern Basketball Association in 1972–73.

Reactions to his death
On 2 May 2016, the Town Hall of Gijón, where he lived during 27 years, renamed in his honour the central court of the Municipal Palacio de Deportes.

References

External links
Draft Review profile

1944 births
2016 deaths
American expatriate basketball people in France
American expatriate basketball people in Spain
American men's basketball players
Basketball players from Atlanta
Bàsquet Manresa players
Centers (basketball)
Gijón Baloncesto coaches
Hartford Capitols players
Joventut Badalona players
Los Angeles Stars draft picks
Los Angeles Stars players
New York Nets players
Seattle SuperSonics draft picks
Tennessee State Tigers basketball players
Texas Chaparrals players